Thomas E. Woodward is a research professor and department chair of the theology department at Trinity College of Florida/Dallas Theological Seminary (Tampa Bay Extension) and a prominent Christian apologist.

Biography
Woodward has published works defending intelligent design and arguing against evolution. Since 1988, he has been (Florida) director of Trinity College's Center for University Ministries (CFUM). Woodward has maintained an evangelical teaching and discipleship ministry and been head of the C.S.Lewis Society, which is housed at Trinity College. Woodward did his doctoral work in the Department of Communication of the University of South Florida. His thesis, a history of the Intelligent design movement, was published by Baker Books as "Doubts About Darwin" in 2003. His second book "Darwin Strikes Back," was released in 2006.

Prior to this, Woodward served with UFM International ("Unevangelized Field Mission International", a missionary organization now known as Crossworld) in the Dominican Republic. Woodward has a B.A. in History awarded by Princeton University and a Th. M. in Systematic Theology from the Dallas Theological Seminary. In the fall of 2006 and the spring of 2007, Woodward was adjunct faculty at the Tampa extension of the Southeastern Baptist Theological Seminary of Wake Forest, North Carolina. He taught classes in "Salvation and Religious Pluralism" and "Eschatology".

Books
Doubts about Darwin: A History of Intelligent Design, Thomas Woodward, Baker Books, June 2003, 
Darwin Strikes Back: Defending the Science of Intelligent Design, Thomas Woodward, Baker Books, November 1, 2006, 
The Mysterious Epigenome: What Lies Beyond DNA, Thomas E. Woodward, James P. Gills, Kregel Publications, January 1, 2011,

Articles
Were the Darwinists Wrong? National Geographic stacks the deck, Thomas E. Woodward, ChristianityToday, November 1, 2004

References

Intelligent design advocates
Living people
Year of birth missing (living people)
University of South Florida alumni
Princeton University alumni